Kim Bendix Petersen (born 14 June 1956), better known by his stage name King Diamond, is a Danish rock musician. As a vocalist, he is known for his powerful and wide-ranging countertenor singing voice, in particular his far-reaching falsetto screams. He is the lead vocalist and lyricist for both Mercyful Fate and the eponymous King Diamond. He also plays keyboards and guitars on studio recordings but uses live shows to focus solely on his vocal performance. Diamond is renowned for his dark lyrical content and his story concepts. He is also known for his distinctive shock stage persona (in particular his black and white facepaint). He has been an influence for other rock and metal artists, including Metallica, Slayer and Cradle of Filth.

Career

Early days
King Diamond's first heavy rock band was called Brainstorm (1974–76), with Jeanette Blum (Jean Blue) on vocals and bass, Michael Frohn (Mike West) on guitar and Jes Jacobsen (Jesse James) on drums. Diamond left Brainstorm and began singing with local Danish hard rock band Black Rose. He began experimenting with horror-themed theatrics and shaping a malevolent quasi-Satanic stage persona. He left Black Rose and joined the punk-metal band Brats, where he met Hank Shermann. The two were soon asked to help Michael Denner (also formerly a member of Brats) with his own project, Danger Zone. This band included Timi Hansen, and the musicians would join with Diamond in 1980 to become Mercyful Fate.

Mercyful Fate

Following Mercyful Fate's 1984 release of Don't Break the Oath and the subsequent tour (which saw them play in the U.S. for the first time), Diamond split ways with Mercyful Fate. With him, he took two of his bandmates (Hansen and Denner) to pursue a solo career under his own name.

Mercyful Fate reunited in 1992 (while Diamond simultaneously continued his solo career) and recorded five more studio albums. In 1999, Diamond and Hank Shermann performed the song "Evil" live with Metallica. This performance also featured Diamond without his famous makeup.

In 2000, Diamond decided to put Mercyful Fate on hold and continue on with his solo career. The band has reunited and is on a North American tour. Also mention of a new song that has been played live called “Jackal of Salzbourg. King has mentionned also that there has been work on the song but not finished yet.  In recent interviews, Diamond has said that Mercyful Fate will record and tour again when the timing is right, saying, "It's definitely not finished."

On 1 August 2019 Mercyful Fate announced a reunion and an accompanying European tour.

King Diamond

In 2001, King Diamond worked out a deal with the band Usurper to sing backup vocals on the song "Necronemesis" in exchange for them shifting their recording schedule around to accommodate the recording of Abigail II: The Revenge. In 2004, Diamond contributed vocals to "Sweet Dreams", the final track on the album of Dave Grohl's heavy metal side project Probot. In late 2005, Diamond appeared on the Roadrunner United – The All-Star Sessions album, contributing vocals for his song "In the Fire", which featured multiple Roadrunner Records musicians (past and present) working together to create individual songs. Diamond also guested on the Cradle of Filth song "Devil Woman" in late 2005.

In April 2006, Diamond reunited with Mikkey Dee (Motörhead drummer) at a sold-out gig at Kåren in Gothenburg, Sweden. In 2001 he referred to Dee as "one of the best drummers of all time and that's something that has bothered us since he left."

Diamond released his album Give Me Your Soul... Please, on 26 June 2007. The band received a Grammy nomination in the "Best Metal Performance" category for the track "Never Ending Hill".

He was forced to cancel a United States tour due to a herniated disk, causing severe back pain, which puts him in intense pain almost all of the time. He attributes the problem to the long stressful hours spent working on the album.

Diamond made an appearance at Ozzfest on 9 August 2008 at Frisco, Texas alongside Metallica, performing a medley of Mercyful Fate songs previously released on Metallica's Garage Inc. album. He also performed a cover of the Pantera song "A New Level" with Vinnie Paul, Scott Ian, Max Cavalera, and Nick Bowcott.

In 2009, Diamond was revealed to be a playable character for the rhythm game Guitar Hero: Metallica, appearing with Mercyful Fate's song "Evil". The player must complete the song on any instrument and any difficulty to unlock the character.

On 29 November 2010, Diamond was taken to the hospital, where doctors discovered several blockages in his arteries due to his heavy smoking habit. They determined that he had had several heart attacks and that he needed triple-bypass surgery, during which time he was medically dead for five hours. The surgery was performed successfully and on 11 December 2010 it was announced that he was at home recovering. All his musical projects were placed on hold.

On 7 December 2011, Diamond appeared on stage with Metallica at the Fillmore in San Francisco to celebrate Metallica's 30th anniversary.

In June 2012, Diamond performed his comeback concert at Sweden Rock Festival.

On Saturday 8 September 2012, Diamond appeared along with Mark Tremonti on VH1 Classic's That Metal Show discussing his surgery and various details about upcoming events.

He appeared on Volbeat's 2013 album, Outlaw Gentlemen & Shady Ladies, providing guest vocals on the track "Room 24". In August 2013 Diamond performed at Open Air Bloodstock Festival, UK.

Slayer was chosen to headline the 2015 Rockstar Energy Mayhem Festival. The bands HELLYEAH, King Diamond, The Devil Wears Prada, Thy Art Is Murder, Jungle Rot, Sister Sin, Sworn In, Shattered Sun, Feed Her To The Sharks, Code Orange and Kissing Candice also participated in the Rockstar Tour.

Other media
Diamond was a special celebrity guest star in four episodes of the Warner Bros. adult-oriented cartoon Metalocalypse as the Blues Devil, Ronald von Moldenberg, a fast food manager, and one of the Klokateers in 2006 on Adult Swim.

Stage presence
On stage, Diamond uses a microphone stand consisting of a femur bone and a tibia bone in the shape of a cross. He previously used a human skull, called Melissa, on stage. In the mid-1980s Melissa was stolen after a performance in the Netherlands.

Diamond has changed the design of his make-up often over the years. With Conspiracy, he wore a mesh of black and white line war paint, with some red "blood" made to look like a wound coming out of his forehead. With his album The Puppet Master, he used very little white and mainly had black crosses and inverted crosses going up and down his face.

Influences
Diamond cites Arthur Brown, David Byron, Alice Cooper, Ronnie James Dio, Ian Gillan, Ozzy Osbourne and Robert Plant as his primary influences.

According to Diamond's biography on his official website, the first two albums he bought were Deep Purple's Fireball and Black Sabbath's Master of Reality.

Religion
Diamond follows Satanism, which he does not see as a religion, but a philosophy by which he lived even before reading Anton LaVey's The Satanic Bible. Michael Moynihan calls him "one of the only performers of the '80s Satanic Metal who was more than just a poseur using a devilish image for shock value". Diamond has expressed concern that religion has led so many people to kill and destroy each other. He stated that he cannot comprehend why religion has caused so much death and destruction when it is logically impossible to prove the presence or absence of any deity. He states that he has reached a point in his life where he has completely given up believing in anything religious.

Personal life
Diamond is married to Livia Zita, a Hungarian-born singer who has made appearances as a backup vocalist on the albums The Puppet Master and Give Me Your Soul...Please, as well as during live performances. She is also his business partner, and is currently working with him to compile old footage for two planned DVD releases of King Diamond and Mercyful Fate live performances. She also helped him make remastered editions of the King Diamond albums The Spider's Lullabye, The Graveyard, Voodoo and House of God.

In 2017, they became parents to a son, Byron, born in March.

Legacy
Metallica released an 11-minute medley of five Mercyful Fate songs on their 1998 Garage Inc. cover album. King Diamond has provided guest vocals for live performances of the medley at Metallica's concerts on three occasions: at the 1999 Gods of Metal festival in Milan, Italy (with Hank Shermann on guitar); at the 2008 Ozzfest in Dallas, Texas; and at a 2011 Metallica fan club gig in San Francisco, California (with Hank Shermann on guitar, Michael Denner on guitar and Timi Hansen on bass).

King Diamond has appeared on the covers of many rock and metal magazines, and has influenced many artists, including Metallica's Lars Ulrich, Cradle of Filth, Cage, and Andy DiGelsomina of the Wagnerian opera metal project Lyraka.

American heavy metal band Cage devoted to him the song "King Diamond" on the album Hell Destroyer in 2007.

Discography

Awards
2008 – Grammy nomination in the "Best Metal Performance" category for the track "Never Ending Hill"

References

External links

King Diamond Coven – official website
Interviews with King Diamond band members Mikki Dee, Pete Blakk, and Andy LaRocque

1956 births
Danish atheists
Danish heavy metal singers
Danish horror writers
20th-century Danish male singers
Danish rock singers
Danish Satanists
Countertenors
English-language singers from Denmark
Heavy metal keyboardists
Living people
Mercyful Fate members
Metal Blade Records artists
Musicians from Copenhagen
21st-century Danish male singers
King Diamond (band) members